Mount Callaghan is a volcanic peak located east of the headwaters of the Squamish River, just northeast of the Powder Mountain Icefield and just south of the Pemberton Icefield in the Sea to Sky Country of southwestern British Columbia, Canada, about 20 km directly west of the Resort Municipality of Whistler. A crack was observed across Callaghan's summit in the spring of 1999. In 2000, a section of the summit collapsed. Callaghan Lake lies below the south face of the mountain.

See also
Callaghan Lake Provincial Park
Callaghan Valley
Volcanism of Canada
Volcanism of Western Canada

References

Volcanoes of British Columbia
Garibaldi Volcanic Belt
Sea-to-Sky Corridor
Subduction volcanoes
Two-thousanders of British Columbia
New Westminster Land District